Paul Heiney (born Paul Wisniewski; 20 April 1949) is a British radio broadcaster and television reporter most notable as a former presenter of That's Life!.

Early life
He was born in Sheffield, Yorkshire, the son of Norbert Wisniewski and Evelyn Mardlin. He changed his surname to Heiney in 1971. He attended Parson Cross Primary School on Halifax Road, Sheffield, and High Storrs Grammar School for Boys.

Career

Radio
In 1971–74 he was one of the founder broadcasters on BBC Radio Humberside with his programme of music, chat and current affairs titled Scunsbygookington, reflecting the key towns in the Humberside region of Scunthorpe, Grimsby, Goole, Kingston-upon-Hull and Bridlington. In 1974–76, he was a reporter for Newsbeat on Radio 1, then in 1976–78, a reporter for the Today programme on Radio 4. Between 1983 and 1985 he presented the Radio 4 consumer programme You and Yours and later was an occasional presenter of the weekly farming magazine programme On Your Farm.

Television
His television debut was on That's Life! in 1978; he stayed on the programme until 1982. He worked on In At The Deep End, The Travel Show, Food and Drink and, on BBC Radio 4, You and Yours. He later presented BBC One's consumer affairs programme Watchdog and also presented the ITV primetime show Countrywise from 2009 to 2015.

In September 2011, Heiney co-hosted a prime time Genealogy series Missing Millions alongside Melanie Sykes on ITV.

Film 

As part of his tasks for the TV series In At The Deep End, Heiney had a speaking role as a German mercenary commander in the 1985 film Water opposite Michael Caine.

Personal life
In 1990, Heiney took up traditional farming in Westleton, Suffolk where he lives with his wife Libby Purves. The couple has one surviving child, Rose, an actress and writer, who has been an occasional columnist for The Times but since has worked as a TV comedy scriptwriter, playwright and author of the novel Days of Judy B.

Their first child, Nicholas, died on 26 June 2006, at age 23; Nicholas hanged himself in the family home after suffering from a serious mental illness. A collection of his poems and sea-logs of a Pacific journey under square rig, The Silence at the Song's End, has been published, inspired a song cycle by Joseph Phibbs, and was broadcast on Radio 4.

For ten years Heiney worked  with Suffolk Punch horses. He wrote a diary of his activities for The Times as well as several books. He also presented two videos about farming with horses, Harnessed to the Plough and First Steps to the Furrow, working with his mentors, Roger and Cheryl Clark.

Heiney had agreed with his wife that they should have the farm for no more than ten years. After the farm's sale Heiney tried to make more time for his other great passion, sailing.

He has also presented A Victorian Summer for Anglia Television, eight half-hour programmes about traditional farming: the glory of working the land with horses as well as the rigours and difficulties that Victorian farmers faced.

In 2005 he took part, in the family boat, in the single-handed transatlantic OSTAR race, and wrote an account of the race's history and his own slow crossing in The Last Man Across The Atlantic.

References

External links
Official website
Heiney visits Bures on the Suffolk/Essex border as part of his "Secret Rivers" series with Anglia Television

British television presenters
1949 births
Living people
People from Sheffield
People from Suffolk Coastal (district)
People educated at High Storrs Grammar School for Boys